Madeleine Nalini Sami is a New Zealand actress, director, comedian and musician. She started her acting career in theatre before moving to television, where she created, wrote, and starred in Super City. She co-wrote, co-directed, and starred in the 2018 film The Breaker Upperers, along with Jackie van Beek, which was a New Zealand box office success. Sami co-hosted The Great Kiwi Bake Off.

Early life 
Sami is one of four children. Her parents are Christine Southee, who has Irish ancestry, and Naren Sami, a Fijian-Indian who settled in New Zealand. Her parents separated when she was 11. She attended Onehunga High School.

Career 

Sami rose to prominence starring in Toa Fraser's play Bare, winning best actress at the 1999 Chapman Tripp Theatre Awards. She then was part of Fraser's next play, No. 2., which won Perrier Comedy Award at the Edinburgh Fringe Festival.

In 2011, Sami created, wrote, and starred in her own comedy series, Super City, which was directed by Taika Waititi. Sami played five different characters in the show and won Best Performance by an Actress at the 2011 AFTA awards. She later co-hosted The Great Kiwi Bake Off and starred in the television series Golden Boy and The Bad Seed. She made her TV directorial debut when she directed an episode of the second season of Funny Girls, eventually directing eleven episodes of the series.

Sami is a part of The Sami Sisters, a musical group consisting of herself and her two sisters. They released an album Happy Heartbreak in 2011.

She co-wrote, co-directed, and starred in the 2018 film The Breaker Upperers, along with Jackie van Beek. The film received positive reviews and was a box office hit in New Zealand, becoming the best selling New Zealand film of 2018 and is one of the top 20 grossing New Zealand films ever. The pair will reunite to direct the Netflix film Hope, starring Aubrey Plaza. Sami also appeared in the 2019 film, Come to Daddy, directed by Ant Timpson.

On May 17, 2021 Sami appeared on The Masked Singer NZ as the "Monarch (Butterfly)", getting eliminated in the fourth episode. The same year she was on the panel show Patriot Brains.

Personal life 
In January 2015, Sami married Pip Brown, known as the singer-songwriter Ladyhawke. Brown gave birth to their daughter on 20 October 2017.

Sami uses she/they pronouns.

Filmography

Film

Television

Theatre

References

External links
 
 NZ on Screen
 Profile at Auckland Actors
 TV3 Super City TV website

1980 births
Living people
New Zealand LGBT comedians
New Zealand LGBT dramatists and playwrights
New Zealand lesbian actresses
New Zealand lesbian writers
New Zealand lesbian musicians
New Zealand television actresses
New Zealand film actresses
New Zealand people of Irish descent
New Zealand people of Indo-Fijian descent
New Zealand women comedians
New Zealand soap opera actresses
Lesbian comedians
Lesbian dramatists and playwrights
People educated at Onehunga High School
20th-century New Zealand actresses
21st-century New Zealand actresses
New Zealand women dramatists and playwrights
New Zealand directors